Walter Elliot or Elliott may refer to:

Walter Elliot (naturalist) (1803–1887), Scottish Indian civil servant and naturalist
Walter Elliot (Scottish politician) (1888–1958), British MP
Walter Elliot (English politician) (1910–1988), British MP
Walter Elliott (sound editor) (1903–1984), American sound editor
Walter Elliott (priest) (1842–1928), American Roman Catholic priest
Walter John Elliot (1914–1979),  Canadian Surgeon General
Walt Elliot (1933–2020), Ontario politician

Characters
 Baronet Walter Elliot, a fictional character from the 1817 Jane Austen novel Persuasion

See also
 Walter B. Elliott causeway, in Newfoundland, Canada